Ambewadi may refer to:

 Ambewadi, Dahanu, a village in Karnataka, India
 Ambewadi, Khanapur, a village in Karnataka, India